Eugene O'Sullivan  may refer to:

Eugene D. O'Sullivan (1883–1968), American Democratic Party politician from Nebraska
Eugene O'Sullivan (Irish politician) (1879–1942), Irish nationalist politician and farmer
 Eugene O'Sullivan (1892–1971), English music hall performer, stage and screen actor, and director, better known as Gene Gerrard.